Parabraxas davidi is a moth in the family Epicopeiidae. It was described by Oberthür in 1885. It is found in western China and Tibet.

References

Moths described in 1885
Epicopeiidae